Nicholas Geoffrey Lemprière Hammond,  (15 November 1907 – 24 March 2001) was a British historian, geographer, classicist and an operative for the British Special Operations Executive (SOE) in occupied Greece during the Second World War.

Hammond is seen as the leading expert on the history of ancient Macedonia. He has been recognized for his meticulous research on the geography, historical topography and history of ancient Macedonia and ancient Epirus.

Life and writings
Hammond studied classics at Fettes College and Gonville and Caius College, Cambridge. In 1929, while he was still a student, Hammond began his personal exploration of all the ancient sites in Epirus.  He excelled in his exams and also spent vacations exploring Greece on foot, acquiring knowledge of the topography and terrain. He also spent some time in southern Albania (Northern Epirus) where he learnt the Albanian language. These abilities led him to be recruited by the Special Operations Executive during World War II in 1940. His activities included many dangerous sabotage missions in Greece (especially on the Greek island of Crete).  As an officer, in 1944 he was in command of the Allied military mission to the Greek resistance in Thessaly and Macedonia. There he came to know those regions thoroughly. He published a memoir of his war service entitled Venture into Greece in 1983; he was awarded the Distinguished Service Order and the Greek Order of the Phoenix.

In the postwar period, Hammond returned to academia as senior tutor at Clare College, Cambridge. In 1954, he became headmaster of Clifton College, Bristol and in 1962 was appointed Henry Overton Wills Professor of Greek at Bristol University, a post which he held until his retirement in 1973. He was elected a Fellow of the British Academy in 1968 and an honorary member of the Centre des Nouvelles études de l'histoire, de la philosophie et des problèmes sociaux à Clermont-Ferrand in 1988.

His scholarship focused on the history of ancient Macedonia and ancient Epirus, and he was considered the leading expert on Macedonia. He was also editor and contributor to various volumes of the Cambridge Ancient History and the second edition of the Oxford Classical Dictionary. He was known for his works about Alexander the Great and for suggesting the relationship of Vergina with Aegae, the ancient Macedonian royal city, before the archaeological discoveries.

In later years, Hammond backed Greece during the Macedonia name dispute.

Personal life
Hammond was the father of two sons (both educated at Clifton College) and three daughters including Caroline Bammel, a noted historian of the early church.

Selected works
A History of Greece to 322 B.C. (1959)
Epirus: the Geography, the Ancient Remains, the History and Topography of Epirus and Adjacent Areas (1967)
Migrations and invasions in Greece and Adjacent Areas (1976)
ed. Atlas of the Greek and Roman World in Antiquity (1981)
Philip of Macedon (1994)
The Genius of Alexander the Great (1997)
The Classical Age of Greece (1999)
 Poetics of Aristotle: Rearranged, Abridged and Translated for Better Understanding by the General Reader (2001)
 A History of Macedonia Volume I: Historical Geography and Prehistory (1972)
 A History of Macedonia Volume II: 550-336 B.C. (1979)
 A History of Macedonia Volume III: 336-167 B.C. (1988)
Alexander the Great. King, Commander, and Statesman
History of Macedonia
Oxford Classical Dictionary (1970) (second edition)
The end of Mycenaean Civilization and Dark Age: the literary tradition (1962)

Notes

References
 Clogg, Richard. [Obituary], The Guardian, 5 April 2001.
 Snodgrass, Anthony. "Professor N.G.L. Hammond: Obituary", The Independent, 28 March 2001.

Further reading

External links

 Alexander's Non-European troops and Ptolemy I's use of such troops, Article by Hammond on BASP 33(1996)
 The scene in Iliad 18.497–508 and the Albanian Blood-feud, Article by Hammond on BASP 22(1985)
Necrology in the American Journal of Archaeology

1907 births
2001 deaths
People educated at Fettes College
Academics of the University of Bristol
Alumni of Gonville and Caius College, Cambridge
British Army personnel of World War II
British classical scholars
Commanders of the Order of the British Empire
Companions of the Distinguished Service Order
Headmasters of Clifton College
Recipients of the Order of the Phoenix (Greece)
Fellows of the British Academy
Fellows of Clare College, Cambridge
British Special Operations Executive personnel
Greek Resistance members
Greece in World War II
Scholars of ancient Greek history
Classical scholars of the University of Bristol
20th-century British historians